La Cumbre is a shield volcano on Fernandina Island in the Galápagos Islands. La Cumbre is also the youngest volcano in the Galápagos Islands.

La Cumbre began erupting again in April 2009. There were fears that lava flowing into the ocean could disrupt and destroy unique flora and fauna of the island, as the flows engulfed much of the island. La Cumbre is the most active volcano of the Galapagos Islands and its peak has an elevation of 1,476 m (4,842 feet). It has experienced several collapses of the caldera floor, often following explosive eruptions. 

On Saturday, June 16th, 2018,  after a period of heavy seismic activity, La Cumbre erupted. A fissure formed on the north north east flank of the volcano. Lava fountains quickly produced a large lava flow that soon reached the ocean. Gas clouds from the eruption reached 2 to 3 kilometers in height, but did not cause any effects due to the low ash concentration.

The volcano started erupting again on 12 January 2020.

References

Shield volcanoes of Ecuador
Calderas of the Galápagos Islands
Active volcanoes